The Ukraine national rugby sevens team is a minor national sevens side.

Tournament history

2008 Hannover Sevens
Group B matches -

Current squad
Head coach: Michel Bishop

Source:

Rugby union in Ukraine
Ukraine national rugby union team
National rugby sevens teams